Royce Peter McGlashen  (born 1949) is a New Zealand ceramicist.

Early life
McGlashen was born in Nelson in 1949, the son of Muir McGlashen who served as mayor of Richmond from 1962 to 1974, and was educated at Waimea College.

Career
In 1966, McGlashen began a five-year apprenticeship with Jack Laird at Waimea Pottery. He moved to Australia where he worked at Montville Pottery in Queensland. In 1974, he travelled to South Africa and then on to England, working at Le Dieu Pottery in Norwich. He returned to New Zealand in 1975. In 1989, he began designing for Temuka Pottery.

Honours and awards
In 1983 and 1987, McGlashen won Merit Awards at the Fletcher Brownbuilt Pottery Awards. In the 1989 New Year Honours, he was appointed a Member of the Order of the British Empire, for services to pottery.

References

1949 births
Living people
People from Nelson, New Zealand
New Zealand potters
New Zealand Members of the Order of the British Empire
People educated at Waimea College